Lathagrium is a genus of lichen-forming fungi in the family Collemataceae. It has 10 species.

Species

Lathagrium auriforme 
Lathagrium cristatum 
Lathagrium dichotomum 
Lathagrium durietzii 
Lathagrium fuscovirens 
Lathagrium latzelii 
Lathagrium neglectum 
Lathagrium poeltii 
Lathagrium subundulatum 
Lathagrium undulatum

References

Peltigerales
Lichen genera
Taxa described in 1810
Taxa named by Erik Acharius
Peltigerales genera